Touro University is a private Jewish university in New York City, New York. It was founded by Rabbi Dr. Bernard Lander in 1971, and named for Isaac and Judah Touro. It is a part of the Touro University System. Its mission includes a strong focus on "transmit[ting] and perpetuat[ing] the Jewish heritage".

The college has about 5500 undergraduates, with a teaching staff of 1242, of which over a third are full-time. It has about 4000 graduate students. About 70% of undergraduates and nearly 80% of graduate students are female. Among undergraduates, some 4% are Asian, 15% are black, 8% are Hispanic and 64% are white. The four-year graduation rate is 46%.

History 
Touro College was founded by Orthodox rabbi and academic sociologist Bernard Lander, who named it for Isaac Touro, an Orthodox rabbi, and his son Judah Touro, a businessman and philanthropist.

Lander's aim was to provide education for Jewish people, combining professional courses with Torah studies. The college received its charter as a private, four-year liberal arts college from the Board of Regents of the State of New York in 1970, and opened its doors in 1971. In its first year it had thirty-five students, all men. A section for women was opened in 1974. The college was accredited by the Middle States Commission on Higher Education in 1976; accreditation was reaffirmed in 2015.

In the 1970s, the school enrolled into its adult-education program large numbers of old people, among them many of whom could neither read nor write English. Federal and state authorities subsequently investigated the school, since they believed that this was being done mainly to obtain grants for tuition.

The college expanded to include schools of law, education, social work, osteopathic medicine, pharmacy, and dentistry.

In 2007, at least two school employees were found in an internal college audit to have accepted bribes to change grades and provide fake degrees. They were handed over for prosecution by the college, and were subsequently convicted and imprisoned.

Lander remained president until his death in 2010, and was succeeded by Alan Kadish.

The goal was to consolidate many of the college's schools, currently divided among at least 35 separate locations servicing 19,000 enrolled students, into a central Manhattan campus.

On February 20, 2022, Touro College announced that the NYS Board of Regents had granted a request to rename the college to Touro University.

Notable alumni 
 Marc Alessi, politician
 David G. Greenfield, local politician
 Rivy Poupko Kletenik, teacher
 Kenneth LaValle, politician
 Boyd Melson, boxer
Kathleen Rice, attorney and politician
 Dmitry Salita, boxer
 Daniel Rosenthal, local politician

Affiliates 

 Lander College for Men Queens, New York
 Touro Israel Jerusalem, Israel
 Lander College for Women Manhattan, New York
 New York Medical College Valhalla, New York
 Lovelace Respiratory Research Institute Albuquerque, New Mexico
 Touro College Jacob D. Fuchsberg Law Center, Central Islip, New York
 Touro University California, Vallejo, California
 Touro University Nevada, Henderson, Nevada
 TUI University, former online subdivision sold in 2007 and now replaced by Touro University Worldwide

See also 
 Henry Abramson
 Marian Stoltz-Loike

References

External links
 Official website

Touro College
Universities and colleges in New York City
Orthodox Jewish universities and colleges
Educational institutions established in 1971
Universities and colleges on Long Island
Universities and colleges in Suffolk County, New York
1971 establishments in New York City
Private universities and colleges in New York City
Jewish universities and colleges in the United States